Genlis may refer to:

Places
Genlis Côte-d'Or, a town in France
 Canton of Genlis, Côte-d'Or
 Genlis, former name of Villequier-Aumont, Aisne; seat of a marquisate

People
Stéphanie Félicité, comtesse de Genlis, French writer
Francois de Hangest Sieur de Genlis & d'Abbecourt, French military commander, known as simply Genlis
Jean de Hangest, seigneur d'Yvoy, Huguenot military commander during the French Wars of Religion, also known as Genlis after the death of his brother Francois